The 1978 Army Cadets football team represented the United States Military Academy in the 1978 NCAA Division I-A football season. In their fifth and final year under head coach Homer Smith, the Cadets compiled a 4–6–1 record and were outscored by their opponents by a combined total of 255 to 188.  In the annual Army–Navy Game, the Cadets lost to the Midshipmen by a 28 to 0 score. 
 
No Army players were selected as first-team players on the 1978 College Football All-America Team.

Schedule

Roster
 Clennie Brundidge, Sr.

References

Army
Army Black Knights football seasons
Army Cadets football